The Canon PowerShot G1 X is a large sensor digital compact camera announced by Canon on January 9, 2012.

It was replaced by the Canon PowerShot G1 X Mark II in Feb 2014.

References
http://www.dpreview.com/products/canon/compacts/canon_g1x/specifications

G1 X
Cameras introduced in 2012